The Northern Ireland women's national football team represents Northern Ireland in international women's football. Although most national football teams represent a sovereign state, FIFA statutes permit Northern Ireland as a member of the United Kingdom's Home Nations   to maintain its own national side that competes in all major tournaments, with the exception of the Women's Olympic Football Tournament.
 
The team were the lowest UEFA-ranked team (27th) to qualify for the European Championships Finals in England in 2022.

In September 2021 it was announced that the senior women's team would be adopting a full-time professional set up ahead of Euro 2022.

Results and fixtures

The following is a list of matches in the last 12 months, as well as any future matches that have been scheduled.

Legend

2022

2023

Players
 Caps and goals may be incorrect.

Current squad
 The following 23 players were called up to the squad for the UEFA Women's Euro 2022.
 Caps and goal correct as of 23 June 2022, before the match against Belgium.

Recent call-ups
 The following players have been named to a squad in the past 12 months.
 This list may be incomplete.

Records
Northern Ireland's Simone Magill holds the world record for the fastest international goal in women's football. Previously, US forward Alex Morgan had held the record at twelve seconds. Magill achieved an eleven-second goal against Georgia at the start of a European Qualifying match on 3 June 2016, after chasing down the ball and then receiving a cross from a teammate. The Irish Football Association awarded her with a special trophy. The goal also marks the fastest ever international goal by any national Northern Irish team – male or female.

Competitive record

FIFA Women's World Cup

*Draws include knockout matches decided on penalty kicks.

UEFA Women's Championship

*Draws include knockout matches decided by penalty kicks.

See also 

 Northern Ireland women's national under-19 football team

 Northern Ireland women's national under-17 football team

References

External links
Official website
FIFA profile

 
Northern Ireland
1973 establishments in Northern Ireland
1973 establishments in the United Kingdom